Pierre Morel (born 12 May 1964) is a French film director and cinematographer. His work includes District 13, From Paris with Love, and Taken.

Career

After spending his formative years in cinema school, Morel debuted in 2000 as camera operator with the first Richard Berry's film L'Art (délicat) de la séduction.

The following year, he began a career as cinematographer, working with such directors as Louis Leterrier, Corey Yuen, Nancy Meyers, Alek Keshishian, Luc Besson and Phillip Atwell. At the same time, he directed his first film District 13 in 2004, followed by Taken in 2008 and From Paris with Love in 2010.

Morel was attached to Paramount's planned adaptation of Frank Herbert's Dune but left the project before it was cancelled. In 2015, he directed the action film The Gunman, starring Sean Penn, Javier Bardem and Idris Elba.

Filmography

Television
Zero Hour (2013) - director, executive producer

References

External links

 
 

1964 births
French cinematographers
French film directors
Action film directors
Living people